Aquilaria is a genus of fifteen species of trees, called lign aloes or lign-aloes trees, in the family Thymelaeaceae, native to southeast Asia. They occur particularly in the rainforests of Indonesia, Thailand, Cambodia, Laos, Vietnam, Malaysia, Northeast India, Bangladesh, the Philippines, Borneo and New Guinea. The trees grow to 6–20 m tall. The leaves are alternate, 5–11 cm long and 2–4 cm broad, with a short acuminate apex and an entire margin. The flowers are yellowish-green, produced in an umbel; the fruit is a woody capsule 2.5–3 cm long.

The genus is best known, together with Gyrinops, as the principal producer of the resin-suffused agarwood used in aromatic incense production, especially Aquilaria malaccensis. The depletion of wild trees from indiscriminate cutting for agarwood has resulted in the trees being listed and protected as an endangered species. Projects are currently underway in some countries in southeast Asia to infect cultivated Aquilaria trees artificially to produce agarwood in a sustainable manner. In Indonesia, for example, there have been proposals to encourage the planting of gahara, as it is known locally, in eastern Indonesia, particularly in the province of Papua.

Species

Aquilaria acuminata , originally Gyrinopsis acuminata
Aquilaria apiculata 
Aquilaria baillonii 
Aquilaria banaensae 
Aquilaria beccariana 
Aquilaria brachyantha 
Aquilaria citrinicarpa 
Aquilaria crassna 
Aquilaria cumingiana 
Aquilaria filaria 
Aquilaria grandiflora 
Aquilaria hirta 
Aquilaria malaccensis, synonyms A. agallocha and A. secundaria
Aquilaria microcarpa 
Aquilaria ophispermum 
Aquilaria parvifolia 
Aquilaria pentandra 
Aquilaria rostrata 
Aquilaria rugosa 
Aquilaria sinensis 
Aquilaria subintegra 
Aquilaria urdanetensis  (Philippines)
Aquilaria yunnanensis

References

 
Thymelaeoideae
Malvales genera